The Utah Grand Slam is an annual competition held throughout the state of Utah in which participants run a series of four marathons throughout the calendar year.  The man and woman with the lowest net time for all four races is declared the winner. There are additional prizes for winners within each age group. The series consists of five marathons: four primary races and one alternate if a runner cannot participate in a primary race.
The Utah Grand Slam has been administered and managed by the Wasatch Running Center in Sandy, Utah since 2004.

Eligible Race List
 Ogden Marathon
 Utah Valley Marathon
 Park City Marathon
 Top of Utah Marathon (Alternate Marathon)
 St. George Marathon

Winners

References

External links
 Utah Grand Slam (Official Site)

Marathons in the United States
Sports competitions in Utah